Jagabor railway station is a railway station on Ahmedabad–Udaipur Line under the Ajmer railway division of North Western Railway zone. This is situated at Jagabor, Bichhiwara Tehsil in Dungarpur district of the Indian state of Rajasthan.

References

Ajmer railway division
Railway stations in Dungarpur district